Ralf Veidemann (7 January 1913 – 2 February 2009) was an Estonian footballer. He played in 13 matches for the Estonia national football team from 1937 to 1940. He was also named in Estonia's squad for the Group 1 qualification tournament for the 1938 FIFA World Cup.

References

1913 births
2009 deaths
Estonian footballers
Estonia international footballers
Place of birth missing
Association football forwards
JK Tallinna Kalev players